Joseph Nicholas Gallo (January 8, 1912 – September 1, 1995) was a New York mobster who served as consigliere of the Gambino crime family under three different bosses.

Joseph N. Gallo was not related to Joe Gallo of the Colombo crime family.

Biography
Joseph N. Gallo was born on January 8, 1912, in Calabria, but grew up in the Little Italy section of Manhattan.  Gallo was married and was the father of Gambino associate Joseph C. Gallo. Joseph N. Gallo and his family lived in Mill Basin, Brooklyn and Long Island City, Queens.

In the 1930s, Gallo was convicted in New York of illegal gambling.

Over the years, Gallo built his power base in the New York garment industry. He owned a dress manufacturing company in Brooklyn and eventually controlled the Greater Blouse, Shirt, and Undergarment Association, a trade group.

Gallo also had strong ties with the Trafficante crime family of Tampa, Florida, and the New Orleans crime family boss Carlos Marcello. Gallo frequently represented their leaders at Cosa Nostra meetings in New York.

In the early 1970s, Gallo replaced Joseph Riccobono as consigliere under boss Carlo Gambino. Gallo was considered as a possible candidate to succeed the ailing Gambino. However, on February 21, 1974, Gallo suffered a severe heart attack. Gallo recovered from this illness, but decided that he did not have the will or stamina to be Gambino's successor.  After Gambino's death in 1976, Gallo continued as consigliere for boss Paul Castellano. In 1986, after Castellano's assassination, new boss John Gotti also kept Gallo as consigliere.

On December 22, 1987, Gallo was convicted of Racketeer Influenced and Corrupt Organizations Act charges that included two counts of bribery and one count of illegal interstate travel to commit bribery. In February 1988, Gallo was sentenced to 10 years in federal prison and ordered to pay fines totaling $380,000.  Before his sentence, he was released on parole to spend a last Christmas with his family, since at his age any sentence imposed on him would have assured he would die in prison.  He became the oldest inmate in federal custody. In 1987, after Gallo's conviction, Gotti replaced him with capo Sammy Gravano at consigliere.

In 1995, Gallo was released from prison. On September 1, 1995, Gallo died of natural causes in Astoria, Queens. He is buried in St. Michaels Cemetery in East Elmhurst, Queens.

References

Further reading
 Capeci, Jerry. The Complete Idiot's Guide to the Mafia. Indianapolis: Alpha Books, 2002. 
 Maas, Peter. Underboss: Sammy the Bull Gravano's Story of Life in the Mafia. New York: HarperCollins Publishers, 1997. 
 Jacobs, James B., Coleen Friel and Robert Radick. Gotham Unbound: How New York City Was Liberated from the Grip of Organized Crime. New York: NYU Press, 2001. 
 Jacobs, James B., Christopher Panarella and Jay Worthington. Busting the Mob: The United States Vs. Cosa Nostra. New York: NYU Press, 1994. 
 Willis, Clint (ed.) Wise Guys: Stories of Mobsters from Jersey to Vegas. New York: Thunder's Mouth Press, 2003.

External links
 

 

1912 births
1995 deaths
American gangsters of Italian descent
Consiglieri
Gambino crime family
People from Mill Basin, Brooklyn
People from Long Island City, Queens
Italian emigrants to the United States